Ajayan Vinu is a material scientist. He is currently the Global Innovation Chair Professor for Advanced Nanomaterials and the director of Global Innovative Centre for Advanced Nanomaterials (GICAN), The University of Newcastle since October 2017 which houses more than 60 researchers including PhD students and staff. Before moving to the University of Newcastle, he was a professor of Nanomaterials at the University of South Australia from 2015-2017. and also worked at the University of Queensland as a Professor and ARC Future Fellow from 2011-2015. He is well known in the field of mesoporous carbon nitride and was the first one to introduce porosity in carbon nitride materials which find applications in different areas of research including catalysis, energy storage and conversion and carbon dioxide capture, and photocatalytic water splitting for hydrogen generation.

Early life and education
Ajayan Vinu was born in a small village located at the extreme South of India called Arumanai in Kanyakumari district in Tamil Nadu, India. He received his Bachelor's and master's degrees in chemistry from Manonmaniam Sundaranar University (MSU) in Tirunelveli district, India (1993-1998). He received his PhD degree in 2003 from Anna University, India, however, he carried out most of his PhD thesis work at Kaiserslautern University of Technology, Germany.

Research career
In 2004 he moved to the National Institute for Materials Science (NIMS), Japan as an International Young Scientist fellow. He has published  more than 500 papers in  journals with ca. 28,550 citations and an H-index of 86 (google scholar). He is a fellow of the Royal Society of Chemistry. In 2018, he was elected as a fellow of the World Academy of Art and Science and an academician of the World Academy of Ceramics. In 2019, he was elected as an academician of the Asia-Pacific Academy of Materials.

During his tenure at NIMS, he was appointed as the NIMS Ambassador to India, and was instrumental in setting up the NIMS-India research centre at Indian Institute of Chemical Technology and appointed to serve as a Research Director for this Center.

Awards and honors
 Academician, Asia-Pacific Academy of Materials (2019)
Medal, Chemical Research Society of India (2018)
Fellow, World Academy of Arts and Science 2018
 Fellow, Royal Society of Chemistry 2013
Academician, World Academy of Ceramics, 2017
 Fellow, Royal Australian Chemical Institute 2017
 Foreign Fellow Award Maharashtra Academy of Sciences 2015
Scopus Young Researcher Award- Elsevier 2014
 ARC Future Fellowship Award 2010
 Bessel Humboldt Award (2010)
 CSJ Young Chemist Award (2010)
 Award of Excellence from Indian Society of Chemists and Biologists(2009)
 Khwarizmi International Award for applied research at 21st session in 2008 alongside Prof C. N. R. Rao who received this award for innovation

References

External links
The Profile of Prof. Ajayan Vinu at the University of Newcastle
Vinu's research group at the university of Newcastle

1976 births
Living people
People from Kanyakumari district
Technical University of Kaiserslautern alumni
Academic staff of the University of South Australia
Fellows of the Royal Society of Chemistry